The Stuttgart Commercial Historic District encompasses a portion of the commercial center of Stuttgart, Arkansas.  The district extends along Main Street between 1st and 6th Streets, and includes a few buildings on the adjacent numbered streets as well as Maple and College Streets, which parallel Main to the west and east, respectively.  The majority of the district's 76 buildings were built between about 1900 and 1920, and are brick commercial structures one or two stories in height.  Notable among these buildings are the Riceland Hotel, the Standard Ice Company Building, and the county courthouse.

The district was listed on the National Register of Historic Places in 2007.

See also
National Register of Historic Places listings in Arkansas County, Arkansas

References

Historic districts on the National Register of Historic Places in Arkansas
Neoclassical architecture in Arkansas
Buildings and structures completed in 1878
Geography of Arkansas County, Arkansas
National Register of Historic Places in Arkansas County, Arkansas
1878 establishments in Arkansas
Buildings designated early commercial in the National Register of Historic Places in Arkansas
Commercial Historic District